Strange Intruder is a 1956 film noir crime film directed by Irving Rapper and starring Edmund Purdom and Ida Lupino.

Plot
Dying in a Korea prisoner-of-war camp, Adrian Carmichael learns his wife Alice has been unfaithful back home. He makes friend Paul Quentin promise not to let the Carmichaels' children be raised by another man, no matter what.

Paul escapes from camp and is treated for trauma in a U.S. hospital for veterans. Having no family of his own, he visits Carmichael's and is made welcome. Alice has ended her affair with Howard Gray, but he is blackmailing her. Paul becomes consumed with his friend's last request and has terrible visions of killing Carmichael's kids.

After a fight with Gray, he comes to realize that a return to the VA hospital is necessary. Treated like a part of the family now, Paul believes his frightening promise to be a thing of the past.

Cast
 Edmund Purdom as Paul Quentin
 Ida Lupino as Alice Carmichael
 Ann Harding as Mary Carmichael
 Jacques Bergerac as Howard Gray
 Gloria Talbott as Meg Carmichael
 Carl Benton Reid as James Carmichael
 Douglas Kennedy as Parry SanBorne 
 Donald Murphy as Dr. Adrian Carmichael 
 Ruby Goodwin as Annie, Alice's housekeeper
 Mimi Gibson as Libby Carmichael
 Eric Anderson as Johnny Carmichael

References

External links

1956 films
American crime drama films
Films directed by Irving Rapper
Films scored by Paul Dunlap
1950s English-language films
Allied Artists films
1956 crime drama films
1950s American films
American black-and-white films